Neal Maupay (born 14 August 1996) is a French professional footballer who plays as a striker for  club Everton.

Maupay started his career with Nice and was a France youth international. He is eligible to play for the Argentina national team through his parent and in February 2022, he made himself available and put in a personal request to Argentina boss Lionel Scaloni to consider selecting him.

Club career

Nice
Maupay began his youth career at US Valbonne at age six in 2002, before moving into the Nice academy in 2007. He progressed through the ranks into the reserve team at the beginning of the 2012–13 season, scoring four goals in three early-season matches before receiving his maiden call into the first team squad on 15 September 2012, for a Ligue 1 match versus Brest. At age 16 years and 32 days, Maupay made his professional debut as an injury-time substitute for Éric Bauthéac during the 3–2 win. He was a regular inclusion in the first team squad from October 2012 through to March 2013 and signed a new two-and-a-half year contract in January 2013. Maupay's season was ended by a torn cruciate ligament suffered during a reserve match on 14 April 2013. Maupay made 19 appearances and scored four goals during the 2012–13 season and when making his Ligue 1 debut and scoring his first Ligue 1 goal, he became the second-youngest player to achieve both feats.

Despite his breakthrough into the first team squad during the 2012–13 season and after recovering from injury, Maupay was out of favour with manager Claude Puel during 2013–14 and 2014–15 seasons, which ultimately caused his departure in August 2015. He made 53 appearances and scored 9 goals during three seasons as a first team player at the Allianz Riviera.

Saint-Étienne
On 10 August 2015, Maupay transferred to Ligue 1 club Saint-Étienne on a four-year contract for a €500,000 fee. Despite making 23 appearances and scoring three goals during the 2015–16 season, he departed on loan for the duration of 2016–17 and left the club in July 2017.

Loan to Brest
On 20 July 2016, Maupay joined Ligue 2 club Brest on a season-long loan. He had a good start to the 2016–17 season, scoring 10 goals in his opening 21 matches, winning the August 2016 UNFP Ligue 2 Player of the Month award and receiving nominations in September, October and December. Injuries in December 2016 and February 2017 disrupted Maupay's good form and he finished the season with 12 goals in 31 appearances.

Brentford
On 14 July 2017, Maupay moved to England to join Championship club Brentford on a four-year contract for an undisclosed fee, reported to be £1.6 million. The club's France scout Brendan MacFarlane, who would also go on to identify Saïd Benrahma, Julian Jeanvier and Bryan Mbeumo, played a key role in the identification of the player as a target. He was deployed as a forward and scored three goals in his opening six appearances for the club, with his first goal coming in a 4–3 defeat to Nottingham Forest on 12 August 2017. By mid-December, Maupay was considered the best "super-sub" of 2017–18 Championship season so far, with four of his five league goals having been scored during substitute appearances. He broke into the starting lineup during the protracted transfer of first choice forward Lasse Vibe away from Griffin Park in January 2018 and he assumed the role full time after Vibe's departure early the following month. Maupay showed improved goalscoring form between mid-January and mid-April, with a run of seven goals in 15 matches. He finished the 2017–18 season with 46 appearances and as the club's top-scorer, with 13 goals.

Maupay had an excellent start to the 2018–19 season and scored 13 goals in his first 17 league appearances. Five goals in August 2018 and four in September led to nominations for the August PFA Fans' Championship Player of the Month and the September EFL Championship Player of the Month awards respectively. 18 goals in 30 appearances by the end of January 2019 saw Maupay win the EFL Player of the Year award at the 2019 London Football Awards. He finished a mid-table season with 28 goals in 49 appearances and was voted the Brentford's Supporters' and Players' Player of the Year.

Brighton & Hove Albion

2019–20 season: Debut season
On 5 August 2019, Maupay moved to Premier League club Brighton & Hove Albion on undisclosed terms, for a fee reported to be in the region of £20 million on a four-year deal. Maupay scored on his debut in the opening match of the 2019–20 season, scoring the third for The Seagulls in a 3–0 away win over Watford. On 14 September, Maupay opened the scoreline in an eventual 1–1 draw against Burnley, claiming his first home goal for the Sussex club. Maupay scored his 10th goal of the season in a 1–1 away draw against Southampton on 16 July 2020, helping Brighton earn an important point towards safety.

2020–21 season

Maupay opened his scoring tally on the second game of the season scoring two inside the first seven minutes in an eventual 3–0 away win over Newcastle. On 26 September, Manchester United were given a penalty after the final whistle due to VAR giving a handball on Maupay right at the end. Bruno Fernandes converted the penalty with United winning the match 3–2. Maupay also scored a penalty himself earlier on in the game in Panenka style. Maupay played in Brighton's 1–0 away victory over defending champions Liverpool on 3 February 2021 claiming their first league win at Anfield since 1982. Maupay was sent off after the full time whistle on 9 May in a 2–1 away loss at Wolves for confronting the referee, Jonathan Moss, with captain Lewis Dunk also being dismissed earlier in the game for pulling back Fábio Silva who was darting for goal. As a result, Maupay missed the last three games of the season.

2021–22 season

Maupay put Brighton back level with Burnley on 14 August in the opening game of the 2021–22 season with Alexis Mac Allister scoring the winner for The Seagulls five minutes later to take all three points at Turf Moor on Maupay's 25th birthday. He scored in the next match, scoring Brighton's second in a 2–0 home win over Watford on 21 August, with the return to a full stadium. On 27 September, away at bitter rivals Crystal Palace, Maupay lobbed Palace keeper Vicente Guaita after a long ball from Joël Veltman and earnt a 90+5th-minute equaliser taking a point back to Sussex after the eventual 1–1 draw. He came on as a substitute in fourth round EFL Cup fixture away at Leicester on 27 September, where he later hit the crossbar in the eventual penalty shootout after the score finished level, with his penalty miss and Enock Mwepu's kick saved by Foxes keeper Danny Ward ending Brighton's hopes of advancing to the quarter finals.
After seven games without scoring, Maupay scored his fifth goal of the season on 1 December away at West Ham, an acrobatic overhead kick from a Tariq Lamptey cross in the 89th minute to earn a 1–1 draw. He scored another late equaliser three days later, this time a 90+8th-minute strike to take it to 1–1 and sharing the points with Southampton at St Mary's Stadium. On Boxing Day, Maupay scored for the third game running, a curled shot from outside the box, doubling Brighton's lead against his former club Brentford in the 2–0 victory at Falmer Stadium. On 8 January 2022, after two games without finding the net, Maupay scored the winner in the 2–1 FA Cup third round away victory at West Bromwich Albion of the Championship to advance Brighton into the fourth round. Maupay's first goal in cup competition for Brighton. In the reverse fixture against Crystal Palace on 15 January, Maupay's opening goal was ruled out by referee Robert Jones via VAR for a high boot challenge on Eagles keeper Jack Butland forcing him to lose grip of the ball, in the eventual 1–1 home draw. He whipped in a fine curled cross from outside the box to set up Danny Welbeck's powerful headed 82nd-minute equaliser in the 1–1 away draw at Leicester on 23 January. Maupay's sublime half-lobbed opener in the eventual 2–0 away victory over Watford on 12 February was his 26th Premier League goal for The Albion, equalling Glenn Murray's club record. Maupay's form was under question during the second half of the season with inconsistency and a lengthily goal drought. He was dropped for fixtures against Arsenal and Tottenham Hotspur after firing over a penalty in the disappointing 0–0 home draw against Norwich City on 2 April. Graham Potter defended the Frenchman saying "he's been fantastic," calling Maupay "a fantastic team player" who's been "really professional in training." After being left on the bench for both North London fixtures he returned to the starting line-up on 24 April, playing 85 minutes of the 2–2 home draw against Southampton. He came on as an 83rd-minute substitute in the 4–0 home thrashing of Manchester United on 7 May, Brighton's biggest ever top flight victory.

Everton
Maupay signed for Premier League club Everton on 26 August 2022 on a three-year contract with an option of a further year for an undisclosed fee. He made his debut on 3 September, playing the whole match of the goalless Merseyside derby draw with Liverpool at Goodison Park.

International career

Maupay is eligible to play for the France or Argentina national teams. He won 35 caps and scored 16 goals for France at U16, U17, U19 and U21 level. He was a member of France's 2015 UEFA European U19 Championship squad and made two appearances in the tournament. Maupay had reportedly put in a personal request to Argentina boss Lionel Scaloni to consider selecting him for the national team in February 2022.

Style of play
Maupay's footballing idol is Zinedine Zidane. He stated that he "can play out wide or as a number 10, but my favoured position is striker. I like to play down the middle and use my pace to get in behind defences" and "I'm used to looking after the ball and holding off defenders".

Personal life
Maupay was born in Versailles and moved to the Côte d'Azur with his family at age five. He is of Argentinian descent on his mother's side and holds both French and Argentinian citizenships since 2013. He has the habit of reading in the locker room before matches.

In June 2020, Maupay was targeted with death threats after scoring a last-minute winning goal against Arsenal. A joint investigation by the Premier League and authorities in Singapore identified the culprit as 19-year-old Derek Ng, who was given a nine-month probation order. This was the first prosecution outside the UK for abusing a Premier League player.

After Argentina won the 2022 FIFA World Cup, Neal Maupay came to headlines for how his cynical tackle in 2020 against Bernd Leno in an English Premier League match allowed Argentina's goalkeeper Emiliano Martínez unknown to everybody at that point to rise and eventually become world champions as part of the Argentine team.

Career statistics

Honours
Individual
UNFP Ligue 2 Player of the Month: August 2016
London Football Awards EFL Player of the Year: 2018–19
Brentford Supporters' Player of the Year: 2018–19
Brentford Players' Player of the Year: 2018–19

References

External links

Profile at the Everton F.C. website

1996 births
Living people
Sportspeople from Versailles, Yvelines
Footballers from Yvelines
French footballers
Association football midfielders
Association football forwards
OGC Nice players
AS Saint-Étienne players
Stade Brestois 29 players
Brentford F.C. players
Brighton & Hove Albion F.C. players
Everton F.C. players
Championnat National 2 players
Ligue 1 players
Ligue 2 players
Championnat National 3 players
English Football League players
Premier League players
France youth international footballers
France under-21 international footballers
French expatriate footballers
Expatriate footballers in England
French expatriate sportspeople in England
French people of Argentine descent
Sportspeople of Argentine descent